Sergei Valerievich Kharitonov (born August 18, 1980) is a Russian professional heavyweight mixed martial artist and former kickboxer. A professional MMA competitor since 2000, Kharitonov has previously fought in Japanese MMA organizations PRIDE Fighting Championships & DREAM (Both in Japan), Bellator MMA, M-1 Global, Strikeforce, and GLORY.

Kharitonov has competed in two major mixed martial arts tournaments and one major kickboxing tournament. He holds notable wins over former EliteXC Middleweight Champion Murilo Rua, former K-1 Champion Semmy Schilt,  former Strikeforce Heavyweight Champion Alistair Overeem, and former UFC Heavyweight Champions Andrei Arlovski and Fabrício Werdum.

Biography
Sergei Kharitonov was born on August 18, 1980 in Plesetsk, Russian SFSR, (now Russia). His parents were very athletic: Sergei's mother was a volleyball coach, and his father at various times studied boxing, skating, football, and long distance marathon running. Under their influence, Sergei was very active physically while growing up.

Kharitonov graduated from a high school with a specialization in music (accordion). Following the advice of his parents as well as his own dreams, Sergei went to the Ryazan Guards Higher Airborne Command School, and enlisted in the Russian Airborne Troops after finishing the academy.  Kharitonov credits the army and the academy with giving him psychological skills he relies on during his fights.

Until resigning from the military in the late 2010s, Sergei remained on the active duty while training full-time. His military rank is captain.

Kharitonov sometimes gets confused with his full namesake Sergey Haritonov, a much less prominent mixed martial arts fighter from Estonia.

Mixed martial arts career

Martial arts background
Sergei started being interested in sports when he was still in kindergarten, being taught at first by his father. Kharitonov started training boxing seriously when he was ten or eleven years old, following an incident when a drunken adult passer-by broke up a scuffle between Sergei and another boy by lifting Sergei in the air, hitting him in the face and cutting his eyebrow with that punch. The man justified his behavior by saying that Sergei should not have been hitting a grounded opponent.

At the age of sixteen, Kharitonov started studying Combat Sambo. During his studies in the Airborne Troops Academy, Sergei started competing in hand-to-hand combat (simplified form of Combat Sambo) and MMA. After Kharitonov graduated from the Academy, he was contacted by Vladimir Pogodin, the manager of the Russian Top Team, who invited him to join the club. At first, Sergei was invited to be Fedor Emelianenko's sparring partner, who taught him many ground fighting techniques, including striking on the ground and submissions. Sergei kept competing at various Russian MMA competitions, and in October 2003 he debuted in Pride Fighting Championships, one of the top two leading MMA organizations in the world at that time.

Sergei trains with the Russian national boxing and Sambo teams, as well as some freestyle wrestlers. He also recently added Muay Thai training to his regimen, and, according to him, he even borrows some elements from karate.

Sergei Kharitonov trained in Kirieevsk, Russia, under coach Mikhail Illoukhine. Ilyukhin chose Kirieevsk as their training base due to a large number of heavyweight MMA fighters available there. According to him, key elements of Sergei's success are his willpower and unpredictability in the ring. As of September 2007 he recently began training with the Golden Glory fight team in the Netherlands.

In addition to competing in MMA and boxing, Sergei competes in Combat Sambo for the Ryazan Desantnik (Paratrooper) club.

PRIDE
Sergei had a successful career as a heavyweight fighter in the Pride Fighting Championships, with an overall Pride record of 8–3–0. As of late 2005, Kharitonov has struggled with ongoing injuries to his upper back and shoulders, evident in his victory against Fabrício Werdum, in which his right shoulder was strained and injured nearly a minute into the bout, and in his loss to Alistair Overeem, where an awkward fall dislocated his shoulder.

Kharitonov lost to Alexander Emelianenko at Pride's Final Conflict Absolute 2006 on September 9, 2006.

Kharitonov scored a win against Mike Russow at PRIDE 33 in Las Vegas on February 24.

K-1 Hero's
On September 17, 2007, Kharitonov TKO's Alistair Overeem in the first round in the Hero's 10: Middleweight Tournament Final event, avenging a previous loss.

DREAM
Kharitonov's next fight was scheduled to be against Mighty Mo at DREAM 6 on September 23, 2008. However Mighty Mo was forced to withdraw due to a back injury. Jimmy Ambriz was Mighty Mo's replacement. Sergei scored a win in the first round by submission via strikes.
At Dream 8 Jeff Monson secured Sergei in a North/South Choke. The Russian tried punching his way out but was soon forced to tap for the first time in his career.

Strikeforce
Sergei signed a deal to fight for Strikeforce and made his debut on February 12, 2011. He faced former UFC Heavyweight champion Andrei Arlovski in the opening round of Strikeforce 2011 Heavyweight Grand-Prix. Sergei defeated Andrei Arlovski by knockout in the first round.  Sergei faced Josh Barnett, who defeated Brett Rogers on June 18, 2011 at Strikeforce: Dallas, in the next round.  He lost via submission in the first round.

Post-Strikeforce 
On June 1, 2012, he submitted John Delgado by keylock at the MMA: Russian Open Championship in St.Petersburg, Russia. Kharitonov has signed with M-1 Global and Oleg Taktarov's Fight Star MMA Promotion and was expected to fight Travis Wiuff in December 2013. This fight did not materialize, but on November 15 of that year Kharitonov  faced Alexey Kudin at M-1 Challenge in Surgut, Russia and defeated him by TKO (punches) in the second round.

In his next appearance, Sergei defeated Tyler East via second-round TKO at Tech-Krep Fighting Championship - Prime on March 21, 2014.

Kharitonov was expected to face Satoshi Ishii on November 11, 2014 at M-1 Challenge 53: Battle in the Celestial Empire. However, Ishii withdrew from the bout due to injury. He instead faced Kenny Garner at the event, which took place on November 25, with Kharitonov winning via doctor stoppage in the third round.

M-1 Global
Kharitonov faced Alexei Kudin on November 15, 2013 at M-1 Challenge 43. He won the fight via TKO in the second round.

Kharitonov beat Kenny Garner at M-1 Challenge 53 on November 25, 2014 via TKO (doctor stoppage) in 3 round.

In the rematch he wins over Kenny Garner again on July 3, 2015 at M-1 Challenge 59 via TKO in the first round.

Bellator MMA
On February 3, 2016 it was announced that Kharitonov had signed with Bellator. Kharitonov made his debut against Javy Ayala on November 4, 2016 at Bellator 163. He lost the fight via knockout in the first round.

Kharitonov faced Chase Gormley at Bellator 175 on March 31, 2017. He won the fight via knockout in the first round.

Kharitonov faced Roy Nelson in the Bellator 207 co-main event on October 12, 2018. He won the fight via knockout in round one.

After the Nelson fight, Kharitonov signed a new multi-fight contract with Bellator and headlined Bellator 215 against Matt Mitrione on February 15, 2019. Unfortunately, the bout ended in a No Contest just 15 seconds into the first round after Mitrione landed an accidental groin strike and Kharitonov was unable to continue.

Kharitonov faced Mitrione in an immediate rematch six months later at Bellator 225 on August 24, 2019. He won the fight via TKO in the second round.

Kharitonov headlined Bellator 234 against Linton Vassell on November 14, 2019. He lost the fight via TKO in the second round.

Kharitonov faced Fernando Rodrigues Jr. at World Total Kombat Federation 5 on February 23, 2020. He claimed the WTKF Heavyweight Championship via second-round knockout.

Next, Kharitonov was supposed to rematch Linton Vassell in May 2020, but the bout was scrapped due to the COVID-19 pandemic.

Kharitonov faced Oli Thompson at MFP Parus Fight Championship on November 7, 2020. He won the fight via first-round knockout.

Kharitonov faced Cheick Kongo on August 20, 2021 at Bellator 265. He lost the fight via a rear-naked choke in round two.

Parus FC & Eagle FC 
Kharitonov defended his Parus FC Heavyweight Championship against Fábio Maldonado at an Parus FC event on November 6, 2021. He won the bout via TKO in the first round.

Kharitonov, as a replacement for Antônio Silva, faced Tyrone Spong on January 28, 2022 at EFC 44. He won the fight by technical knockout in the second round.

Kickboxing
Since signing with team Golden Glory Breda in July 2007, Sergei has been in the Netherlands training with some of the best standup fighters in the world. After his loss to Jeff Monson in April, the decision was made to make the last fight on his Dream contract a K-1 match at the K-1 World Grand Prix 2009 Final on December 5. On November 28, K-1 announced that his opponent would be Daniel Ghita in the second reserve match of the Grand Prix. Ghita was originally scheduled to face Kharitonov's teammate Chalid Arrab, who had to withdraw due to an injury. Ghita defeated Kharitonov by TKO (right low kick) in the third round.

Kharitonov fought Takumi Sato at the 2010 K-1 World Grand Prix in Seoul.  Kharitonov won by KO in the first round. On December 11 at the 2010 K-1 World Grand Prix Final Sergei was defeated by Singh Jaideep by TKO (punches) in the first round. Kharitonov faced Samoan kickboxer Mighty Mo at the United Glory World Series Finals in Moscow on May 28, 2011.  He won via KO in the first round. On March 23, 2012, Kharitonov met Mark Miller at United Glory 15 in Moscow, and won by KO (right hook) in the first round.

He lost to Rico Verhoeven at the opening round of the sixteen-man 2012 Glory Heavyweight Grand Slam held at Glory 4: Tokyo - 2012 Heavyweight Grand Slam in Saitama, Japan on December 31, 2012. Verhoeven was leading the judges' scorecards after the first two, two-minute rounds and so was given the victory.

He was set to fight Jérôme Le Banner at Glory 10: Los Angeles in Ontario, California, United States on September 28, 2013 but the Frenchman withdrew after suffering a neck injury.

Kharitonov defeated Daniel Sam via unanimous decision at Glory 11: Chicago - Heavyweight World Championship Tournament in Hoffman Estates, Illinois on October 12, 2013.

The Jérôme Le Banner fight was rescheduled for Glory 13: Tokyo - Welterweight World Championship Tournament in Tokyo, Japan on December 21, 2013. Kharitonov won by unanimous decision.

He lost to Anderson "Braddock" Silva via UD the semi-finals of the Glory 16: Denver - Heavyweight Contendership Tournament in Broomfield, Colorado, US on May 3, 2014.

Replacing Pat Barry who withdrew from the fight for undisclosed reasons, Kharitonov was scheduled to face Mirko "Cro Cop" Filipović at Glory 17: Los Angeles in Inglewood, California on June 21, 2014. Kharitonov then also withdrew, citing a finger injury, and was replaced by Jarrell Miller. On October 11, 2014, at the W5 Grand Prix in Moscow, Kharitonov again faced Silva, winning the rematch by second-round TKO.

Boxing
Kharitonov started his Amateur Boxing Career in 2000. He tried to get into the Russian Olympic Boxing team but got injured in the semi finals during a live boxing TV event. Instead he competed for Tajikistan in 2003 at the Central Asian Games where he won a silver medal. Kharitonov earned a shot at that year’s Olympics, representing former Tajikistan (the former Soviet republics often have ethnic Russians on their teams) but passed on the chance to instead fight in the Pride 2004 Heavyweight Grand Prix.

Kharitonov nearly qualified for the Athens Games by winning the silver medal at the 2004 Asian Amateur Boxing Championships in Puerto Princesa, Philippines. In the final he was defeated by Uzbekistan's Rustam Saidov. In the fall of 2004 he competed in the Russian Boxing Championship and placed second. Sergei could not fight in the final match due to an injury.

Kharitonov defeated Danny Williams on September 11, 2020 in his professional boxing debut.

Personal life
Kharitonov and his wife Natalya have one child.

Championships and accomplishments

Boxing
 2003 Central Asian Games silver medalist
 2004 Asian Championships silver medalist
 2007 Russian Championship silver medalist.

Mixed martial arts
MFP Parus Fight Championship
Parus FC Heavyweight Championship 
World Total Kombat Federation 
WTKF Heavyweight Championship 
PRIDE Fighting Championship
PRIDE 2004 Heavyweight Grand Prix semi-finalist
Strikeforce
Strikeforce 2011 Heavyweight Grand Prix semi-finalist
Other
Tournament of Real Men 8 champion.
Brilliant 2 – Yalta's Brilliant 2000 champion.

Kickboxing
W5
W5 World Heavyweight Championship

Other
 Six times champion Russian Airborne Troops Hand-to-hand combat fight.
 Russian Airborne Troops Sambo champion.
 Eurasia Combat Sambo champion.
 Three times champion Russian Army combat fight.
 Three times champion Russian combat  Hand-to-hand fight.
 World Universal Fight Unifight champion.
 Two times Russian Free Fight champion

Mixed martial arts record

|-
|Win
|align=center|34–9 (2)
|Tyrone Spong
|TKO (punches)
|Eagle FC 44
|
|align=center|2
|align=center|2:55
|Miami, Florida, United States
|
|-
| Win
| align=center| 33–9 (2)
| Fabio Maldonado
| TKO (punches)
| MFP Parus Fight Championship
| 
| align=center| 1
| align=center| 3:28
| Dubai, United Arab Emirates
| 
|-
| Loss
| align=center| 32–9 (2)
| Cheick Kongo
| Submission (rear-naked choke)
| Bellator 265
| 
| align=center| 2
| align=center| 4:59
| Sioux Falls, South Dakota, United States
| 
|-
| Win
| align=center| 32–8 (2)
| Oli Thompson
| KO (punch)
| MFP Parus Fight Championship
| 
| align=center| 1
| align=center| 2:50
| Dubai, United Arab Emirates
| 
|-
| Win
| align=center| 31–8 (2)
| Fernando Rodrigues Jr.
| KO (punch)
| World Total Kombat Federation 5
| 
| align=center| 2
| align=center| 0:08
| Minsk, Belarus
| 
|-
| Loss
| align=center| 30–8 (2)
| Linton Vassell
| TKO (punches)
| Bellator 234
| 
| align=center| 2
| align=center| 3:15
| Tel Aviv, Israel
|
|-
|Win
|align=center| 30–7 (2)
|Matt Mitrione
|TKO (knee and punches)
|Bellator 225
|
|align=center|2
|align=center|1:24
|Bridgeport, Connecticut, United States
|
|-
| NC
| align=center| 29–7 (2)
| Matt Mitrione
| NC (accidental groin strike)
| Bellator 215
| 
| align=center| 1
| align=center| 0:15
| Uncasville, Connecticut, United States
| 
|-
| Win
| align=center| 29–7 (1)
| Roy Nelson
| KO (punches and knee)
| Bellator 207
| 
| align=center|1
| align=center|4:59
| Uncasville, Connecticut, United States
|
|-
| NC
| align=center| 28–7 (1)
| Anton Vyazigin
| NC (accidental eye poke)
| M-1 Challenge 92: Kharitonov vs. Vyazigin
| 
| align=center|2
| align=center|0:20
| St. Petersburg, Russia
|
|-
| Win
| align=center| 28–7
| Joey Beltran
| Decision (unanimous)
| Russian Cagefighting Championship
| 
| align=center|3
| align=center|5:00
| Yekaterinburg, Russia
|
|-
| Win
| align=center| 27–7
| Geronimo dos Santos
| Submission (ankle lock)
| M-1 Challenge 81: Battle in the Mountains 6
| 
| align=center|1
| align=center|2:13
| Nazran, Russia
|
|-
| Win
| align=center| 26–7
| Rameau Thierry Sokoudjou
| KO (punch)
| M-1 Challenge 80: Kharitonov vs. Sokoudjou
| 
| align=center|1
| align=center|0:40
| Harbin, China
|
|-
| Win
| align=center| 25–7
| Chase Gormley
| KO (punch)
| Bellator 175
| 
| align=center|1
| align=center|3:55
| Rosemont, Illinois, United States
|
|-
| Loss
| align=center| 24–7
| Javy Ayala
| KO (punch)
| Bellator 163
| 
| align=center|1
| align=center|0:16
| Uncasville, Connecticut, United States
|
|-
| Win
| align=center| 24–6
| Kenny Garner
| TKO (punches)
| M-1 Challenge 59: Battle of Nomads 5
| 
| align=center| 1
| align=center| 4:11
| Astana, Kazakhstan
|
|-
| Win
| align=center| 23–6
| Kenny Garner
| TKO (doctor stoppage)
| M-1 Challenge 53: Battle in the Celestial Empire
| 
| align=center| 3
| align=center| 2:01
| Beijing, China
|
|-
| Win
| align=center| 22–6
| Tyler East
| TKO (punches)
| Tech-Krep Fighting Championship: Prime
| 
| align=center| 2
| align=center| 2:54
| Krasnodar, Russia
| 
|-
| Win
| align=center| 21–6
| Alexei Kudin
| TKO (punches)
| M-1 Challenge 43
| 
| align=center| 2
| align=center| 4:56
| Surgut, Russia
| 
|-
| Win
| align=center| 20–6
| John Delgado
| Submission (americana)
| MMA: Russian Open Championship
| 
| align=center| 1 
| align=center| 0:34 
| St.Petersburg, Russia
| 
|-
| Loss
| align=center| 19–6
| Josh Barnett
| Submission (arm-triangle choke)
| Strikeforce: Barnett vs. Kharitonov
| 
| align=center| 1
| align=center| 4:28
| Cincinnati, Ohio, United States
| 
|-
| Win
| align=center| 19–5
| Andrei Arlovski
| KO (punches)
| Strikeforce: Fedor vs. Silva
| 
| align=center| 1 
| align=center| 2:49 
| East Rutherford, New Jersey, United States
| 
|-
| Win
| align=center| 18–5
| Tatsuya Mizuno
| KO (knee)
| Dynamite!! 2010
| 
| align=center| 1
| align=center| 1:25
| Saitama, Japan
| 
|-
| Loss
| align=center| 17–5
| Jeff Monson
| Submission (north-south choke)
| DREAM 8
| 
| align=center| 1
| align=center| 1:42
| Nagoya, Japan
| 
|-
| Win
| align=center| 17–4
| Jimmy Ambriz
| TKO (submission to punches)
| DREAM 6: Middleweight Grand Prix 2008 Final Round
| 
| align=center| 1
| align=center| 2:15
| Saitama, Japan
| 
|-
| Win
| align=center| 16–4
| Alistair Overeem
| KO (punch)
| HERO'S 10: Middleweight Tournament Final
| 
| align=center| 1
| align=center| 4:21
| Yokohama, Japan
| 
|-
| Win
| align=center| 15–4
| Mike Russow
| Submission (armbar)
| PRIDE 33
| 
| align=center| 1
| align=center| 3:46
| Las Vegas, Nevada, United States
| 
|-
| Loss
| align=center| 14–4
| Alexander Emelianenko
| TKO (punches and knees)
| PRIDE FC: Final Conflict Absolute
| 
| align=center| 1
| align=center| 6:45
| Saitama, Japan
| 
|-
| Loss
| align=center| 14–3
| Alistair Overeem
| TKO (knees)
| PRIDE 31: Dreamers
| 
| align=center| 1
| align=center| 5:13
| Saitama, Japan
| 
|-
| Win
| align=center| 14–2
| Fabrício Werdum
| Decision (split)
| PRIDE 30: Fully Loaded
| 
| align=center| 3
| align=center| 5:00
| Saitama, Japan
| 
|-
| Win
| align=center| 13–2
| Peter Mulder
| Submission (armbar)
| RINGS Russia: CIS vs. The World
| 
| align=center| 1
| align=center| 6:16
| Yekaterinburg, Russia
| 
|-
| Win
| align=center| 12–2
| Pedro Rizzo
| TKO (soccer kick and punches)
| PRIDE FC: Critical Countdown 2005
| 
| align=center| 1
| align=center| 2:02
| Saitama, Japan
| 
|-
| Win
| align=center| 11–2
| Choi Mu-Bae
| KO (punches)
| PRIDE 29: Fists of Fire
| 
| align=center| 1
| align=center| 3:24
| Saitama, Japan
| 
|-
| Loss
| align=center| 10–2
| Antônio Rodrigo Nogueira
| Decision (unanimous)
| PRIDE Final Conflict 2004
| 
| align=center| 2
| align=center| 5:00
| Saitama, Japan
| 
|-
| Win
| align=center| 10–1
| Semmy Schilt
| TKO (punches)
| PRIDE Critical Countdown 2004
| 
| align=center| 1
| align=center| 9:19
| Saitama, Japan
| 
|-
| Win
| align=center| 9–1
| Murilo Rua
| KO (punches)
| PRIDE Total Elimination 2004
| 
| align=center| 1
| align=center| 4:14
| Saitama, Japan
| 
|-
| Win
| align=center| 8–1
| Cory Peterson
| Submission (armbar)
| PRIDE 27
| 
| align=center| 1
| align=center| 1:23
| Osaka, Japan
| 
|-
| Win
| align=center| 7–1
| Jason Suttie
| Submission (armbar)
| PRIDE Bushido 1
| 
| align=center| 1
| align=center| 2:25
| Saitama, Japan
| 
|-
| Loss
| align=center| 6–1
| Martin Malkhasyan
| Submission (knee bar)
| Legion Fight Black Sea Cup 2003 (Stage 2)
| 
| align=center| 1
| align=center| 4:45
| Rostov-on-Don, Russia
| 
|-
| Win
| align=center| 6–0
| David Shvelidze
| Submission (heel hook)
| rowspan=2| TORM 8: Tournament of Real Men 8
| rowspan=2| 
| align=center| 1
| align=center| 1:00
| rowspan=2| Yekaterinburg, Russia
| 
|-
| Win
| align=center| 5–0
| Osman Vagabov
| Submission (rear-naked choke)
| align=center| 1
| align=center| 0:47
| 
|-
| Win
| align=center| 4–0
| Sergey Kaznovsky
| Submission 
| IAFC: Mega-Sphere Cup 2
| 
| align=center| 1
| align=center| N/A
| Moscow, Russia
| 
|-
| Win
| align=center| 3–0
| Roman Savochka
| TKO (hand injury)
| rowspan=3| Brilliant 2: Yalta's Brilliant 2000
| rowspan=3| 
| align=center| 1
| align=center| 3:11
| rowspan=3| Yalta, Ukraine
| 
|-
| Win
| align=center| 2–0
| Viacheslav Kolesnik
| TKO (punch)
| align=center| 1
| align=center| 1:26
|
|-
| Win
| align=center| 1–0
| Zamir Syrgabayev
| TKO (submission to punches)
| align=center| 1
| align=center| 2:43
|

Kickboxing record 

|- style="background:#cfc;"
| 2018-05-30 || Win ||align=left| Frédéric Sinistra || Zhara Fight Show || Moscow, Russia || TKO (3 knockdowns) || 2 || N/A ||  7-4
|- style="background:#cfc;"
| 2014-10-11 || Win ||align=left| Anderson Silva || W5 Grand Prix - Rematch || Moscow, Russia || TKO (Punches) || 2 || 2:50  || 6-4
|-
! style=background:white colspan=9 |
|- style="background:#fbb;"
| 2014-05-03 || Loss ||align=left| Anderson Silva || Glory 16: Denver - Heavyweight Contender Tournament, Semi Finals || Broomfield, Colorado, USA || Decision (Unanimous) || 3 || 3:00 || 5-4
|- style="background:#cfc;"
| 2013-12-21 || Win ||align=left| Jérôme Le Banner || Glory 13: Tokyo || Tokyo, Japan || Decision (Unanimous) || 3 || 3:00 || 5-3
|- style="background:#cfc;"
| 2013-10-12 || Win ||align=left| Daniel Sam || Glory 11: Chicago || Hoffman Estates, Illinois, USA || Decision (Unanimous) || 3 || 3:00 || 4-3
|- style="background:#fbb;"
| 2012-12-31 || Loss ||align=left| Rico Verhoeven || Glory 4: Tokyo - Heavyweight Grand Slam Tournament, First Round || Saitama, Japan || Decision (Unanimous) || 2 || 2:00 || 3-3
|- style="background:#cfc;"
| 2012-03-23 || Win ||align=left| Mark Miller || United Glory 15 || Moscow, Russia || KO (Right hook) || 1 || 1:59 || 3-2
|- style="background:#cfc;"
| 2011-05-28 || Win ||align=left| Mighty Mo || United Glory 14|United Glory 14: 2010-2011 World Series Finals || Moscow, Russia || KO (Right uppercut) || 1 || 1:59 || 2-2
|- style="background:#fbb;"
| 2010-12-11 || Loss ||align=left| Singh Jaideep || K-1 World Grand Prix 2010 Final || Tokyo, Japan || KO (Right hook) || 1 || 2:58 || 1-2
|- style="background:#cfc;"
| 2010-10-02 || Win ||align=left| Takumi Sato || K-1 World Grand Prix 2010 in Seoul Final 16 || Seoul, South Korea || KO (Strikes) || 1 || 2:50 || 1-1
|- style="background:#fbb;"
| 2009-12-05 || Loss ||align=left| Daniel Ghiţă || K-1 World Grand Prix 2009 Final || Yokohama, Japan || KO (Right low kick) || 3 || 0:36 || 0-1
|-
| colspan=9 | Legend:

Professional boxing record

Exhibition boxing record

Bareknuckle boxing record

|-
|Win
|align=center|1–0
|Mike Cook
|TKO (punch)
|BYB Extreme Fight Series
|
|align=center|1
|align=center|2:27
|Miami, Florida, United States
|-
|}

See also
List of current Bellator fighters
List of Strikeforce alumni
List of male mixed martial artists

References

External links
 

 
Profile at K-1

1980 births
Living people
People from Plesetsky District
Russian male mixed martial artists
Heavyweight mixed martial artists
Russian male kickboxers
Heavyweight kickboxers
Russian submission wrestlers
Super-heavyweight boxers
Russian Muay Thai practitioners
Russian sambo practitioners
Russian military personnel
Russian male boxers
Glory kickboxers
Ryazan Guards Higher Airborne Command School alumni
Mixed martial artists utilizing sambo
Mixed martial artists utilizing boxing
Mixed martial artists utilizing kickboxing
Mixed martial artists utilizing Muay Thai
Mixed martial artists utilizing ARB
Sportspeople from Arkhangelsk Oblast